Harris Kenneth Wangelin (May 10, 1913 – June 10, 1987) was a United States district judge of the United States District Court for the Eastern District of Missouri and of the United States District Court for the Western District of Missouri.

Education and career

Born in Des Moines, Iowa, Wangelin received an Associate of Arts degree from Iberia Academy and Junior College in 1932 and a Juris Doctor from the University of Missouri School of Law in 1936. He was in private practice in Van Buren, Missouri, from 1936 to 1937. He was an adjuster for the Maryland Casualty Company in Missouri from 1937 to 1942. He was a Lieutenant (SG) in the United States Navy during World War II, from 1942 to 1945. He then returned to private practice in Poplar Bluff, Missouri, until 1970.

Federal judicial service

On December 8, 1970, Wangelin was nominated by President Richard Nixon to a joint seat on the United States District Court for the Eastern District of Missouri and the United States District Court for the Western District of Missouri vacated by Juge Roy Winfield Harper. Wangelin was confirmed by the United States Senate on December 17, 1970, and received his commission on December 22, 1970. He served as Chief Judge of the Eastern District from 1979 to 1983. He assumed senior status on May 10, 1983, serving in that capacity until his death on June 10, 1987, in Poplar Bluff.

References

Sources
 

1913 births
1987 deaths
University of Missouri School of Law alumni
Judges of the United States District Court for the Western District of Missouri
Judges of the United States District Court for the Eastern District of Missouri
United States district court judges appointed by Richard Nixon
20th-century American judges
United States Navy officers
20th-century American lawyers
People from Carter County, Missouri
People from Poplar Bluff, Missouri